The Yokohama is a German breed of fancy chicken, with unusual colouring and very long tail-feathers. Some of these were shipped from the Japanese port of Yokohama, and so were known by that name. In Germany, the Yokohama name is used only for white or red-saddled birds; in the United Kingdom, it is used also for the birds known elsewhere as Phoenix, in various colours.

History 

From 1639 to 1854 – almost all of the Edo period – Japan was effectively closed to foreign trade. Under the Convention of Kanagawa of 1854, five ports were to be constructed for trade with the rest of the world. One of these was Yokohama, which opened in 1859. Among the goods exported to Europe were unusual traditional Japanese long-tailed chickens; the first documented export was in 1864. In that year, some of the birds reached the Jardin Zoologique d'Acclimatation in Paris, where they were named Yokohama for their port of origin. It is not known whether he created the red-saddled colouring by cross-breeding, or if birds with that colouring had been brought from Japan; it is no longer found there. The Yokohama was among the breeds illustrated by Jean Bungartz in his Geflügel-Album of 1885.

Some birds were exported to the United Kingdom, where a breeders' club was formed in about 1904. There the Yokohama name was used both for du Roi's Yokohama birds and for another, quite distinct, breed he had developed, the Phoenix, which has a single comb and a different range of colours.

The bantam Yokohama was bred in Germany in the usual way, by cross-breeding standard-sized birds with suitablycoloured bantams of other breeds.

Characteristics 

The Yokohama is a small chicken with an unusually long tail, and long trailing saddle feathers. It has a pea- or walnut-comb. The beak, legs and feet are yellow.

In Germany two colours are recognised, white and red-saddled. In the United Kingdom, where the name Yokohama is used also for the birds known in Germany as Phoenix, there are several more colours in addition to red-saddled and white; these include black-tailed buff, blue-red, spangled, black-red, golden duckwing and silver duckwing. In the United States, the red-saddled (red-shouldered) and white varieties were added to the Standard of Perfection in 1981.

Use 

The Yokohama is kept mainly for showing. Full-sized hens lay about 80 eggs per year; they are tinted and weigh about  Bantam hens lay about 90 eggs averaging  in weight.

References 

Chicken breeds
Chicken breeds originating in Germany